Madame Two Swords is a fantasy novelette by Tanith Lee.  It was first published in 1988 by Donald M. Grant, Publisher, Inc. in an edition of 600 copies and was issued without a jacket.  All copies were signed by the author and the artist.  The story is a fantasy set during the French Revolution.

References

External links 

1988 books
1988 short stories
Fantasy short stories
Donald M. Grant, Publisher books